George Cossar Pringle FRSE (1858–c.1930) was a Scottish school-teacher and author. He is mainly remembered for the Pringle History Map series.

Life
He was born in 1858 the son of George Pringle (1820–1881) and his wife, Elizaabeth Cossar (1827–1881).

He was Rector of Peebles Burgh and County High School for most of his later life. In 1908 he was elected a Fellow of the Royal Society of Edinburgh. His proposers were John Alison, John Brown Clark, David Fowler Lowe and George Chrystal. He resigned from the Society in 1920.

In the First World War he served on the Teachers War Service Committee.

Publications
Peebles and Selkirk
Notes of Lessons on Thrift (1916)

References

1858 births
Scottish non-fiction writers
People from Peebles
Fellows of the Royal Society of Edinburgh
1930s deaths
Scottish schoolteachers